Mount Coleman is a  mountain summit located in the upper North Saskatchewan River valley in Banff National Park, in the Canadian Rockies of Alberta, Canada. Its nearest higher peak is Cirrus Mountain,  to the north. Mount Coleman is situated along the east side the Icefields Parkway midway between Saskatchewan Crossing and Sunwapta Pass.

History

Mount Coleman was named in 1898 after Arthur P. Coleman (1852-1939), a Canadian geologist and among the first white men to explore the area that is now Jasper National Park.

Geology

Like other mountains in Banff Park, Mount Coleman is composed of sedimentary rock laid down from the Precambrian to Jurassic periods. Formed in shallow seas, this sedimentary rock was pushed east and over the top of younger rock during the Laramide orogeny.

Climate

Based on the Köppen climate classification, Mount Coleman is located in a subarctic climate with cold, snowy winters, and mild summers.

Further reading
 Chic  Scott,  Pushing the Limits: The Story of Canadian Mountaineering, P 70

See also
Geography of Alberta

References

External links
 Parks Canada web site: Banff National Park

Coleman
Coleman